Mark Bibbins (born 1968 in Albany, New York) is an American poet and received an MFA from The New School.

He received a Lambda Literary Award for his collection of poems Sky Lounge (Graywolf Press, 2003), and was awarded a 2005 Poetry Fellowship from the New York Foundation for the Arts.

Bibbins's second book of poetry, The Dance of No Hard Feelings (Copper Canyon Press, 2009) "takes much of its subject matter and its attitude from life in George W. Bush's America … These poems are made powerful by the bitter energy of a voice not silenced but made to sound ridiculous in a political culture in which disagreement with the government is unpatriotic."

His most recent book of poetry, They Don't Kill You Because They're Hungry, They Kill You Because They're Full (Copper Canyon Press, 2014) is a thorny spirited examination of power, sexuality, and gender.

He currently teaches in the graduate writing programs at The New School, where he co-founded LIT magazine, and Columbia University. He lives in New York.

Bibliography

Poetry 
Collections
Sky Lounge (Graywolf Press, 2003)
The Dance of No Hard Feelings (Copper Canyon Press, 2009)

List of poems

References

1968 births
Living people
American male poets
21st-century American poets
American gay writers
Lambda Literary Award for Gay Poetry winners
American LGBT poets
Poets from New York (state)
The New School alumni
The New Yorker people
Writers from Albany, New York
21st-century American male writers
Gay poets